The Swetland Building is a building located in downtown Portland, Oregon, listed on the National Register of Historic Places.

History 
Camera World was headquartered in the building from 1977 until the late-1990s, with its retail store occupying the ground floor at SW 5th and Washington until 1995, when it moved to the 400 SW Sixth Avenue building. The company's administrative offices and mail-order operations remained on other floors until at least 1997.

See also
 National Register of Historic Places listings in Southwest Portland, Oregon

References

External links
 

1907 establishments in Oregon
Buildings and structures completed in 1907
Buildings designated early commercial in the National Register of Historic Places
National Register of Historic Places in Portland, Oregon
Southwest Portland, Oregon